The area in United States west of the Appalachian Mountains and extending vaguely to the Mississippi River, spanning the lower Great Lakes to the upper south, is a region known as trans-Appalachia, particularly when referring to frontier times. It included much of Ohio Country and at least the northern and eastern parts of the Old Southwest. It was never an organized territory or other political unit. Most of what was referred to by this name became the states of western Pennsylvania, Ohio, West Virginia, Kentucky, Tennessee and western Virginia. It is still a vague and little used place name today.

A similar name, trans-Allegheny, has much the same usage (usually as an adjective) and refers to the Allegheny Mountains, the northern portion of the Appalachians.

First US inhabitants of the trans-Appalachia region
Starting in the mid-18th century, Americans who wanted to find a better life in the wilderness traveled several main roads over the Appalachians.  Those from New England followed the Mohawk Trail into western New York.  The travelers from Philadelphia took Forbes' Road to Pittsburgh, where they could travel west on the Ohio River.  From Baltimore, they went to Pittsburgh on Braddock's Road.  Middle Atlantic settlers used Cumberland Road (the National Road).  Southerners used either the Great Valley Road or the Richmond Road through the mountains to the Cumberland Gap.  From there they could take the Wilderness Road northward into present day Kentucky and the Ohio Valley. Daniel Boone was hired by the Transylvania Company to cut the Wilderness Road.

Increasing trans-Appalachian populations

Between 1790 and 1810, around 98,000 slaves, along with their owners, moved west into the region south of the Ohio River (the Northwest Ordinance of 1787 had forbidden slavery in states north of the Ohio).
 By 1795, in Kentucky, 75,000
 By 1830, hundreds of thousands of settlers were in the region, which at that time consisted of Michigan Territory, and the new states of
 Ohio, with 1,000,000 inhabitants,
 Indiana, with almost 350,000 inhabitants, and
 Illinois, with more than 150,000 inhabitants.

See also
Trans-Mississippi, everything west of trans-Appalachia
Kentucky County, Virginia
Ohio Country
Overhill Cherokee
Overmountain Men
State of Franklin
Transylvania Colony
Vandalia (colony)
Southwest Territory
Wilderness Road

Appalachia
1790s in the United States
History of the Midwestern United States
Regions of the United States
19th century in the United States